Palace Lady Aeiju of the Yeon clan was the concubince of King Hyejong of Goryeo

References

Royal consorts of the Goryeo Dynasty
Year of birth unknown
Year of death unknown